Nils Nilsen (born 29 December 1952) is a Norwegian former ice hockey player. He was born in Oslo, Norway and played for the club IF Frisk Asker. He played for the Norwegian national ice hockey team at the 1980 Winter Olympics.

References

External links

1952 births
Living people
Frisk Asker Ishockey players
Ice hockey players at the 1980 Winter Olympics
Norwegian ice hockey players
Olympic ice hockey players of Norway
Ice hockey people from Oslo